Scolizona ulnaformis is a moth in the family Lecithoceridae. It is found in Papua New Guinea.

The wingspan is 18–19 mm. The forewings are uniformly covered with brownish scales throughout. There is a pair of large blackish discal spots before the middle and at the end of the cell, usually the middle one is larger. The hindwings are pale grey and slightly broader than the forewings.

Etymology
The species name is derived from Latin ulna (meaning elbow) and formis (meaning form) and refers to the shape of labial palpus.

References

Moths described in 2011
Lecithocerinae